Die glückliche Familie (The Happy Family) is a German television series made up of three seasons, and has a total of 52 episodes. The series ran from 1987 to 1991 on Wednesdays. This show tells the story of the Behringer family living through their day-to-day problems.

See also
List of German television series

External links
 

1987 German television series debuts
1991 German television series endings
Television shows set in Munich
German-language television shows
Das Erste original programming